Unuoi Va`enuku (born 5 April 1976) is a Tongan former rugby union player. He played as centre.

Career
Va`enuku debuted for Tonga during the 1995 Rugby World Cup, playing all the three pool stage matches, being his first cap against France in Pretoria. His last cap for Tonga was during the third pool stage match against Ivory Coast in Rustenburg.

References

External links

1967 births
Living people
Tongan rugby union players
Rugby union centres
Tonga international rugby union players